QSF may refer to:
 Quebec Soccer Federation
 Qalamoun Shield Forces, a Syrian militia
 IATA code for Ain Arnat Airport, an airport in Algeria
 Unofficial code for airports in the San Francisco Metropolitan Area, used in some ticketing systems but not approved by IATA
 An uncompressed variant of the Portable Sound Format
 Extension and file format for data files exported by Qualtrics online survey software